The Three-Minute Universe is a science fiction novel by American writer Barbara Paul, part of the Star Trek: The Original Series franchise.

Plot

The Sackers, a race of physically repellent beings, murder almost an entire race to steal a powerful device. This device rips a hole in the fabric of space, bringing in a brand-new universe that threatens the old one.

References

External links

Novels based on Star Trek: The Original Series
1988 American novels
American science fiction novels